The Queen Maud Gulf Migratory Bird Sanctuary is Canada's largest federally owned protected area, encompassing some  of the Arctic Circle coastline.  are marine, and  are terrestrial.

Under the terms of the Ramsar Convention, it was designated as a wetland of international importance in 1982. It is the world's second-largest Ramsar Site. The majority of the park is lowlands and countless streams, ponds and shallow lakes. The land is mainly Arctic tundra and marshes.

In 1982, 450,000 geese, including the majority of the world's Ross's geese, nested in the sanctuary, one of the largest concentration of geese on Earth.

The protected area was established in 1961 under the Migratory Bird Sanctuary Regulations of the Migratory Birds Convention Act of 1917. It was named for Queen Maud of Norway.

Threats
There are no current threats as it is a federally protected land mass.

See also
List of Nunavut parks
List of Ramsar wetlands of international importance

References

External links
Queen Maud Gulf Migratory Bird Sanctuary, Nunavut - Ramsar Site
Queen Maud Gulf Migratory Bird Sanctuary at Parks Canada
Significant Facts about Canadian Protected Areas

Parks in Kitikmeot Region
Ramsar sites in Kitikmeot Region
Bird sanctuaries of Kitikmeot Region
Migratory Bird Sanctuaries of Canada